Christer Youssef (born 1 December 1987) is a Swedish former professional footballer who played as a midfielder.

References

External links
 Christer Youssef at Fotbolltransfers
 
 
 

1987 births
Assyrian/Syriac Syrians
Swedish people of Assyrian/Syriac descent
Swedish footballers
Sweden under-21 international footballers
Swedish expatriate footballers
Syrian expatriate footballers
Living people
Syrian footballers
Syrian Christians
Swedish people of Syrian descent
Djurgårdens IF Fotboll players
IF Brommapojkarna players
Aris Limassol FC players
Assyriska FF players
FC Hansa Rostock players
Christer Youssef
Assyriska IK players
Allsvenskan players
Superettan players
3. Liga players
Association football midfielders
Assyrian footballers
Swedish expatriate sportspeople in Cyprus
Swedish expatriate sportspeople in Germany
Swedish expatriate sportspeople in Thailand
Expatriate footballers in Cyprus
Expatriate footballers in Germany
Expatriate footballers in Thailand